Lymantria sugii is a moth in the family Erebidae. It is found in Taiwan.

References

Moths described in 1986
Lymantria